Cyril Krejčí (born 18 May 1957) is a Czech volleyball player. He competed in the men's tournament at the 1980 Summer Olympics.

References

1957 births
Living people
Czech men's volleyball players
Olympic volleyball players of Czechoslovakia
Volleyball players at the 1980 Summer Olympics
Sportspeople from Havlíčkův Brod